Cartio is a surname. Notable people with the surname include:

Alec Cartio, Iranian-Swedish music video and commercial and film director.
Cameron Cartio, Iranian-Swedish singer